In cricket, a run-up is the approach a bowler makes when preparing to deliver the ball. The ball must be delivered from behind a bowling crease, but preparation to bowl the ball can be done any way the bowler wishes. Every different bowler approaches the wicket in a personal way, and so there can be many and varied "run-ups".

However, as a general rule the different types of bowlers use similar approaches to each other. For example, Spin bowlers tend to have very short run-ups, some even approach the bowling crease at a walking pace. Medium bowlers tend to run up off a short run-up of about 10 paces or so. Fast bowlers tend to have long, rhythmical run-ups to allow them to develop momentum which adds to their ability to bowl the ball at high speeds.

The term "run-up" can also refer to the area where the bowler runs during his run-up.

References

Bowling (cricket)
Cricket terminology